Mood swing or mood swings most often refers to mood swings, a change in mood

Mood Swing or Mood Swings may also refer to:

 Mood Swing (The Nails album), 1984
 Mood Swings (Harem Scarem album), 1993
 Mood Swings (Koby Israelite album), 2005
 Mood Swings (Small Sins album), 2007
 "Mood Swings" (A Boogie wit da Hoodie song), 2019
 "Mood Swings" (Pop Smoke song), 2020
 "Mood Swings" (Tove Styrke song), 2021